This is a list of notable male hurdlers (110 m H- 400 m H) since the first Olympic Games in 1896.

This list includes athletes who have been a medalist in the Olympic Games or World championships (indoor and outdoor). Also included are medalists in the IAAF World Cup and WAF events.  Other criteria for inclusion include any athlete who held a world record (WR) or was ranked in the top three of their event by Track and Field News magazine (rankings since 1947). Finally, it includes any athlete ranked (by time) in the top three of a hurdles event for any given year since 1980.

Key for abbreviations used:
WR is world record, 
+ designates a hand timed result, 
OG means Olympic champion for given year/s,
WC means world champion for the given year/s.

A
Derrick Adkins USA, 400 m H,
WC 1995
OG 400 m H, 1996
John Akii-Bua UGA, 400 m H,
OG 1972
WR 47.82 2 September 1972
Kriss Akabusi GBR
Mubarak Al-Nubi QAT
Hadi Soua'an Al-Somaily KSA
Henry Amike NGR
Jeshua Anderson USA
Steve Anderson USA
Henry Andrade USA CPV
Eronilde de Araújo BRA
Vasyl Arkhypenko URS (UKR)
Lesley Ashburner USA
Sydney Atkinson SAF, 110 m H,
OG 1928
Dick Attlesey USA, 110 m H
WR 13.6+ 10 June 1950,
WR 13.5+ 24 June 1950,

B
Charles Bacon USA, 400 m H,
OG 1908,
WR 55.0+ July 1908
Falk Balzer GER
Harold Barron USA
Percy Beard USA, 110 m H,
WR 14.4+ 23 June 1932,
WR 14.3+ 26 July 1934,
WR 14.2+ 6 August 1934,
Volker Beck GDR, 400 m H,
OG 1980
Jim Bolding USA, 400 m H
Shaun Bownes RSA
Bryan Bronson USA
Arto Bryggare FIN
David Burghley GBR, 400 m H,
OG 1928

C
Lee Calhoun USA, 110 m H,
OG 1956, 1960
WR 13.2+ 21 August 1960
Milt Campbell USA, 110 m H
Tonie Campbell USA
James Carter USA
Alejandro Casañas CUB, 110 m H,
WR 13.21 21 August 1977
Frank Castleman USA
Warren "Rex" Cawley USA, 400 m H,
OG 1964
WR 49.1+ 13 September 1964
 David Cecil
Roy Cochran USA, 400 m H,
OG 1948
Wayne Collett USA, 400 m H
John Collier USA
Dedy Cooper, 110 m H
John Cooper GBR
Mark Crear USA
Frank Cuhel USA
Josh Culbreath USA, 400 m H
Thomas Curtis USA, 110 m H,
OG 1896
Cliff Cushman USA

D
Willie Davenport USA, 110 m H,
OG 1968 OG;
WR 13.33 17 October 1968,
WR 13.2+ 4 July 1969 WR
Calvin Davis USA
Glenn Davis USA, 400 m H
OG 1956, 1960,
WR 49.5+ 29 June 1956,
WR 49.2+ 6 August 1958,
Jack Davis USA, 110 m H,
WR 13.4+ 22 June 1956
Anthony Dees USA
August Desch USA
Amadou Dia Bâ SEN
Stéphane Diagana FRA, 400 m H,
WC 1997
Harrison Dillard USA, 110 m H,
OG 1952
Craig Dixon USA
Dudley Dorival HAI
Ladji Doucouré FRA 110 m H
Guy Drut FRA, 110 m H,
OG 1976
 WR 13.0+ 22 August 1975
Juan Carlos Dyrzka ARG, 400 m H 
John Duda LA CITY Champion 1961 180yd low hurdles.

F
Earl Fee CAN Masters world record holder
Don Finlay GBR
Charles Foster USA
Greg Foster USA, 110 m H,
WC 1983, 1987, 1991
Roberto Frinolli ITA, 400 m H

G
Anier García CUB, 110 m H,
OG 2000
John Garrels USA
Willie Gault USA
Yevgeniy Gavrilenko URS (BLR)
John Gibson USA, 400 m H,
WR 52.6+ 2 July 1927
Grantley Goulding GBR
Winthrop Graham JAM

H
Ervin Hall USA, 110 m H, 13.38 17 October 1968,
WR 13.2+ 19 June 1969
Glenn Hardin USA, 400 m H,
OG 1936
WR 52.0+ August 1932,
WR 51.8+ 30 June 1934,
WR 50.6+ 26 July 1934
Danny Harris USA
Martin Hawkins USA
Alfred Healey GBR
David Hemery GBR, 400 m H,
OG 1968
WR 48.12 15 October 1968
Gerhard Hennige FRG
Llewellyn Herbert RSA
Thomas Hill USA, 110 m H,
WR 13.2+ 13 June 1970
Harry Hillman USA, 400 m H,
OG 1900
Dick Howard USA

I
Periklis Iakovakis GRE

J
Bershawn Jackson USA, 400 m H
WC 2005
Colin Jackson GBR, 110 m H,
WC 1993, 1999
WR 12.91 20 August 1993
Helmut Janz FRG, 400 m H 4th place 1960 Olympics
Tony Jarrett GBR
Allen Johnson USA, 110 m H,
WC 1995, 1997, 2001, 2003
OG 1996
Hayes Jones USA, 110 m H,
OG 1964

K
Igors Kazanovs URS (LAT)
Naman Keïta FRA
Jack Keller USA, 110 m H,
WR 14.4+ 17 July 1932
Fred Kelly USA, 110 m H,
OG 1912 ;
Aleksandr Kharlov URS (UZB)
James King USA
Roger Kingdom USA, 110 m H,
OG 1984, 1988
WR 12.92 16 August 1989
Daniel Kinsey USA, 110 m H,
OG 1924
Gary Knoke AUS, 400 m H
Igor Kovác SVK
Alvin Kraenzlein USA, 110 m H,
OG 1900

L
Rune Larsson SWE
Martin Lauer FRG, 110 m H,
WR 13.2+ 7 July 1959
Robert Leavitt USA, 110 m H,
OG 1906
Nick Lee USA, 400 m H
Blaine Lindgren USA
Yuriy Lituyev URS (RUS), 400 m H,
WR 50.4+ September 1953
John Loaring CAN
Frank Loomis USA, 400 m H,
OG 1920
WR 54.0+ 16 August 1920
Liu Xiang CHN, 110 m H,
OG 2004

M
Ralph Mann USA, 400 m H
Ruslan Mashchenko RUS, 400 m H
Samuel Matete ZAM, 400 m H,
WC 1991
Ralph Maxwell USA Masters M90 world record
Willie May USA, 110 m H
Earl McCullouch USA, 110 m H,
WR 13.43 June 1967
Danny McFarlane JAM
John McLean USA
Omar McLeod JAM
Mark McKoy CAN/AUT, 110 m H,
OG 1992
Joel McNulty USA, 110 m H
Anatoliy Mikhailov URS (RUS)
Aries Merritt USA, 110 m H
Rod Milburn USA, 110 m H,
OG 1972
WR 13.24 2 September 1972
Fred Moloney USA
Charles Moore USA, 400 m H,
OG 1952
Tom Moore, USA 120 y H
=WR 14.2h
Javier Moracho ESP
Salvatore Morale ITA, 400 m H,
WR 49.2+ 14 September 1962
Alvin Moreau USA,
WR 14.2+ 2 August 1935
Dinsdale Morgan JAM
Fabrizio Mori ITA, 400 m H,
WC 1999
John Morris USA,
WR 14.4+ 8 September 1933
Edwin Moses USA, 400 m H,
WC 1983, 1987
OG 1976, 1984
WR 47.64 25 July 1976,
WR 47.45 11 June 1977,
WR 47.13 3 July 1980,
WR 47.02 31 August 1983
Thomas Munkelt GDR, 110 m H,
OG 1980

N
Jean-Claude Nallet FRA, 400 m H
Renaldo Nehemiah USA, 110 m H,
WR 13.16 14 April 1979,
WR 13.00 6 May 1979,
WR 12.93 19 August 1981
John Norton USA, 400 m H,
WR 54.2+ 26 June 1920
Aarne Nirk
Sven Nylander (SWE)

O
Gary Oakes GBR
Staņislavs Olijars LAT
George Orton CAN (USA)
Eddy Ottoz ITA
Laurent Ottoz ITA
Patrick Ottoz ITA

P
Hansle Parchment JAM
David Patrick USA 400 m IH 47.75
Sten Pettersson SWE, 110 m H,
WR 14.8+ 18 September 1927
WR 400 m H, 53.8+ 4 October 1925
Andre Phillips USA, 400 m H,
OG 1988
Jack Pierce USA
George Poage USA
Fritz Pollard, Jr. USA
George Porter USA HSR 300 IH 35.32 / 400 IH 49.19
William Porter USA, 110 m H,
OG 1948
Gert Potgieter SA, 400 m H
Norman Pritchard IND
Aleksandr Puchkov URS (RUS)

R
Chris Rawlinson GBR
Jon Ridgeon GBR, 110 m H
Ivan Riley USA
Duane Ross USA

S
George Saling USA, 110 m H,
OG 1932
WR 14.4+ 2 August 1932
Félix Sánchez DOM, 400 m H,
WC 2001,2003
OG 2004, 2012
Marcel Schelbert SUI
Harald Schmid FRG
Florian Schwarthoff GER
Fred Schule USA, 110 m H,
OG 1904
Harry Schulting NED
Clyde Scott USA, 110 m H
Joel Shankle USA
Arthur Shaw USA
John Sherwood GBR
Thaddeus Shideler USA
Mike Shine USA
Don Shy USA, 110 m H
Bengt Sjöstedt FIN, 110 m H,
WR 14.4+ 5 September 1931
Vyacheslav Skomorokhov URS, 400 m H
Forrest Smithson USA, 110 m H,
OG 1908
WR 15.0+ 27 July 1908
Eddie Southern USA
Don Styron USA still holds WR 21.9 1960 in 200 m and 220y Hurdles

T
Dai Tamesue JPN
Jerry Tarr USA, 110 m H
Henri Tauzin FRA
Angelo Taylor USA, 400 m H,
OG 2000
Morgan Taylor USA, 400 m H,
OG 1924
WR 52.0+ July 1928
Walter Tewksbury USA, 400 m H,
OG 1896
Kemel Thompson JAM
Earl Thomson CAN, 110 m H,
OG 1920
WR 14.8+ 18 August 1920
Bob Tisdall IRL, 400 m H,
OG 1932
Reggie Torian USA
Milan Tosnar CZE
Forrest "Spec" Towns, 110 m H,
OG 1936
WR 14.1+ 19 June 1936,
WR 14.1+ 6 August 1936,
WR 13.7+ 27 August 1936
Terrence Trammell USA
Jimmy Tremeer GBR
Alberto Triulzi ARG, 110 m H
Oleg Tverdokhleb UKR

U
Sergey Usov URS (EUN)

V
Emilio Valle CUB
Geoff Vanderstock USA, 400 m H,
WR 48.6+ 11 September 1968
Attie van Heerden RSA
Erik Vilen FIN

W
Larry Wade, 110 m H
Fred Wolcott USA, 110 m H,
WR 13.7+ 29 June 1941
James Walker USA, 400 m H
Nigel Walker GBR
Frank Waller USA
James Wendell USA
George Weightman-Smith RSA,
WR 14.6+ 31 July 1928
Eric Wennström SWE, 110 m H,
WR 14.4+ 25 August 1929
Duncan White CEY
Miguel White PHI
Ron Whitney USA, 400 m H
Maurice Wignall JAM
Jerry Wilson USA, 110 m H
Miroslaw Wodzynski POL, 110 m H
Joey Woody USA
Reggie Wyatt USA 300 m IH HSR 35.02 400 m IH 49.46-2010
Karsten Warholm – 45.94 WR 2021

Y
Kevin Young USA,
OG 1992
WC 1993
WR 46.78 August 1992

Z
Torrance Zellner, 400 m H

See also
 

Male hurdlers
Lists of male athletes